The Nations' Big Three is a South Korean cooking-variety program which has been broadcast since August 28, 2015.

From July 21, 2017, the program was spun off to Paik Jong-won's Food Truck.

Since January 5, 2018, it was again spun off to Paik Jong-won's Alley Restaurant.

Broadcast Timeline

Cast

Main host
Main host
 Paik Jong-won (Episodes 1–94)
 Kim Jun-hyun (Episodes 1–94)
 Lee Hwi-jae (Episodes 1–62)
 Hani (EXID) (Episodes 22–51)
 Soyou (Sistar) (Episodes 52–62)
 Lee Si-young (Episodes 62–90)
Fixed guest
 Kim Ji-min (Episodes 34–94)
  (Episodes 42–59)

Special host
 Twice (Tzuyu, Dahyun) (Episode 27)
 Hong Jin-young (Episode 28)
 Jung Eun-ji (Apink) (Episode 29)
  (Episode 30)
 Han Chae-ah (Episodes 91–94)

List of Episodes

2015

2016

2017

Awards and nominations

References

External links
The Nations' Big Three on SBS official website 

2015 South Korean television series debuts
2017 South Korean television series endings
Korean-language television shows
Seoul Broadcasting System original programming
South Korean variety television shows
South Korean cooking television series